Cinema Sabaya (Hebrew: סינמה סבאיא) is a 2021 Israeli drama film, directed by Orit Fouks Rotem and produced by the Israeli production company, Green Productions. It stars an all-female cast, including Dana Ivgi, Amal Murkus, Marlene Bejali, Ruthie Landau, Haula Haj-Divsi, Joanna Said, Yulia Tagil, Asil Farhat, Orit Samuel and Liora Levy. In 2022 the film was chosen as the official Israeli nominee for the Academy Award for Best International Film at the 95th Academy Awards. This followed its Ophir Award win for Best Feature Film (along with four additional Ophir Awards). Previously to that, it had also won the Best Debut Film Award at the Jerusalem Film Festival. On March 8, 2022, in celebration of International Women's Day, the film was chosen for a special screening at Beit HaNassi, the Israeli President's Residence. In November 2022 it was picked up by Kino Lorber for North American distribution rights.

Plot 
A group of Arab and Jewish women attend a video workshop at a small town community center run by Rona, a young filmmaker from Tel Aviv, who teaches them to document their lives. As each student shares footage from her home life with the others, their beliefs and preconceptions are challenged and barriers are broken down. The group comes together as mothers, daughters, wives, and women living in a world designed to keep them apart, forming an empowering and lasting bond as they learn more about each other... and themselves. Inspired by writer/director Orit Fouks Rotem's own experiences as a teacher, Cinema Sabaya presents a deft and heartfelt portrait of art's capacity to unite disparate communities, moving effortlessly between the gravity of their conversations and the genuine joy generated by this unlikely group of friends.

Cast 
Dana Ivgi - Director and host of the workshop.

Liora Levy - a lonely woman, a sailor who lives on a yacht.

Marlene Bajali - an elderly Arab woman who gives advice to the participants from her life experience.

Yulia Tagil - an Israeli of Russian origin who lives with her daughters and with her mother after her divorce.

Ruthie Landau - a Librarian who is in the second chapter of her life after divorcing an abusive husband.

Orit Samuel - a married woman whose depressive husband is distant from her.

Amal Murkus - a lawyer and social and political activist who dreamed of becoming a singer.

Asil Farhat - a young Palestinian woman who challenges the conservative lifestyle in her environment.

Joanna Said - mother of six, religious woman who wants to get a driver's license but is afraid of her husband's reaction.

Production 
The film was co-produced by Roi Kurland, Gal Greenspan and Maya Fischer from the Israeli production company, Green Productions (Israel). It was co-produced by Neon Rouge (Belgium) and  supported by the Israeli Film Fund, Wallonia-Brussels Federation, The Weil-Bloch Foundation, The New Fund for Cinema and Television, Israel Film Council and The Ministry of Culture and Sports, United King Films, The Israel Lottery Council for Culture & Arts, and Other Israel.

Release 
Before its debut, in June 2021 the film was picked up by French sales company, Memento International. The film later debuted at the 2021 Jerusalem Film Festival and was then commercially released in Israel by United King (September 2022). In November 2022 it was picked up by Kino Lorber for North American distribution rights.

Reception

Awards and Nominations 
Cinema Sabaya won the Best Debut Film Award at the Jerusalem Festival and five Ophir Awards: Ophir Award for Best Feature Film, Ophir Award for Best Director to Orit Fouks Rotem, Ophir Award for Best Supporting Actress awarded to Joanna Said, Ophir Award for Best Costume Design awarded to Rachel Ben Dahan, Ophir Award for Best Casting awarded to Emanuel Meyer. The film won the Weil Bloch Award for 2021. The award was presented by Gal Gadot.  The film is nominated to represent Israel in the category of the best foreign film in the Oscar.

Accolades

References

External links 

 
 
 Official Trailer 
 Exclusive Q&A // SHIRA HAAS with Cinema Sabaya’s team (Israel’s Official Oscars Entry 2023)
 
 

2022 films
2022 drama films
Israeli drama films
2020s Arabic-language films
2020s Hebrew-language films
Films shot in Israel
Israeli multilingual films